Highland is a city in Utah County, Utah, United States. According to the 2010 census the population was 15,523, a 90.0% increase over the 2000 figure of 8,172.

Geography

History
Highland was settled by homesteaders in the 1870s. It was named by Scottish Mormon immigrants who felt the area resembled the highlands of Scotland.

Demographics

As of the 2010 census, Highland had a population of 15,523. The median age was 22. The racial makeup of the population was 95.9% white, 0.5% black or African American, 0.2% Native American, 0.7% Asian, 0.7% Pacific Islander, 0.5% from some other race, and 1.5% from two or more races. 2.8% of the population was Hispanic or Latino of any race.

At the 2000 census, there were 8,172 people in 1,804 households, including 1,733 families, in the city. The population density was 1,174.0 people per square mile (453.3/km). There were 1,864 housing units at an average density of 267.8 per square mile (103.4/km). The racial makeup of the city was 97.49% White, 0.12% African American, 0.13% Native American, 0.31% Asian, 0.10% Pacific Islander, 0.73% from other races, and 1.11% from two or more races. Hispanic or Latino of any race were 2.17%.

Of the 1,804 households, 66.5% had children under 18 living with them, 90.6% were married couples living together, 4.0% had a female householder with no husband present, and 3.9% were non-families. 3.3% of households were one person, and 1.7% were one person aged 65 or older. The average household size was 4.53, and the average family size was 4.64.

The age distribution was 45.1% under the age of 18, 9.8% from 18 to 24, 23.5% from 25 to 44, 17.3% from 45 to 64, and 4.3% 65 or older. The median age was 21 years. For every 100 females, there were 104.4 males. For every 100 females aged 18 and over, there were 99.2 males.

The median household income was $80,053, and the median family income was $81,086. Males had a median income of $57,318 versus $24,440 for females. The per capita income for the city was $19,614. About 1.8% of families and 2.8% of the population were below the poverty line, including 3.6% of those under age 18 and none of those age 65 or over.

Education

Highland Public schools are part of the Alpine School District. Vern Henshaw is the Superintendent of Schools.

Notable people
 Thurl Bailey, retired NBA basketball player, whose career spanned from 1983 to 1999 with the Utah Jazz and the Minnesota Timberwolves
 Fraser Bullock, Managing Director of Sorenson Capital and former COO of the 2002 Winter Olympics
 Blair Buswell, an artist who specializes in sports sculptures
 Ashly DelGrosso, a dancer who starred in Dancing with the Stars for the first three seasons
 Larry M. Gibson, entrepreneur and former first counselor in the general presidency of the Young Men organization of the Church of Jesus Christ of Latter-day Saints
 Tyler Haws, BYU basketball player
 Brandon Mull, writer, best known as the author of the popular Fablehaven series
 Dennis Smith, sculptor

See also

 List of cities and towns in Utah

References

External links

 

Cities in Utah
Cities in Utah County, Utah
Provo–Orem metropolitan area
Populated places established in 1977